Balsamand Lake is a lake situated  from Jodhpur on Jodhpur-Mandore Road. This lake is a popular picnic spot, by Balak Rao Pratihar in 1159 AD who belongs to the kshatriya community. It was designed as a water reservoir to provide water to Mandore.

Balsamand Lake Palace
The Balsamand Lake Palace was built later as a summer palace on its shore. The lake is surrounded by lush green gardens that house groves of trees like mango, papaya, pomegranate, guava and plum. Animals and birds like the jackal and peacock also call this place home.

See also
List of lakes in India

References

Lakes of Rajasthan
Tourist attractions in Jodhpur
1159 establishments in Asia
Jodhpur
12th-century establishments in India